Giant horsetails are usually living species of horsetail that grow to very large sizes, more than 1.5 metres (5 ft). 

The following species are commonly known as "giant horsetails":
 Equisetum giganteum (southern giant horsetail, from Latin America)
 Equisetum telmateia (northern giant horsetail, from North America, North Africa and Eurasia)
 Equisetum myriochaetum  (Mexican giant horsetail, from Mexico, Central America and Northern South America)

In addition, any giant member of the Equisetopsida (horsetails and their prehistoric relatives) is liable to be called "giant horsetail" even though they are not true horsetails. Most often, the term "giant horsetail" in this somewhat inaccurate sense refers to Calamitaceae in Paleozoic contexts; in the Mesozoic, the term usually refers to the Equisetites assemblage.

The oldest known fossil of giant horsetail dates from Miocene epoch and is found in Ñirihuau Formation in Patagonia.

References